Tetrops elaeagni is a species of beetle in the family Cerambycidae. It was described by Nikolay Nikolaevich Plavilstshchikov in 1954. It is known from Russia, Kazakhstan, China, Uzbekistan, and Turkmenistan.

Subspecies
 Tetrops elaeagni shapovalovi Danilevsky, 2018
 Tetrops elaeagni elaeagni Plavilstshikov, 1954
 Tetrops elaeagni plaviltshikovi Kostin, 1973

References

Tetropini
Beetles described in 1954